The 850s decade ran from January 1, 850, to December 31, 859.

Significant people 
 Al-Mutawakkil
 Charles the Bald
 Louis the German
 Lothar
 Ethelwulf of Wessex
 Bardas
 Kenneth I of Scotland
 Halfdan the Black
 Abu Ja'far Muhammad ibn Musa al-Khwarizmi

References

Sources